Bhandarkars' Arts & Science College is a college in Kundapur, Udupi district, India. The College, sponsored by the Academy of General Education, Manipal started functioning from June, 1963 and today  it is one of the progressive institutions affiliated to the Mangalore University. It has around 2500 students. The college has a vast library having more than 90,000 books and a well equipped Internet café. It is one of the only libraries in Kundapur (probably in Udupi) having an elevator. The building was built at a cost of 1.2 crore. A new building completely dedicated to computer science has also been constructed.

The college also provides a separate reading room with books and magazines. There is also a quiet room for study. The current Principal of the Pre-University College is Sri G. M. Gonda and of Degree College is Dr. N P Narayana Shetty.

This college is managed by Academy of General Education, Manipal. The College is founded in order to meet the growing demand for the University education and to make it available nearer home so that the economically less fortunate sections of the community may equip themselves better to face challenges in the age of science, technology and international commerce.

The college offers BA, BCOM, BBA, BSC and BCA degrees.

Vision

To make higher education available to all sections of the community emphasizing inculcation of moral and human values.

Departments:

The college has the following departments which offer different courses like Bachelors of Science (B.Sc.), Bachelors of Arts (B.A.), Bachelors of Commerce (B.Com.), Bachelors of Business Administration (B.B.A.) and, Bachelors of Computer Applications (B.C.A.): 

 Department of Applied Biosciences (Microbiology, Biochemistry and Biotechnology) 
 Department of Botany
 Department of Business Administration
 Department of Chemistry
 Department of Computer Science and Application
 Department of Commerce
 Department of Economics
 Department of English
 Department of Hindi
 Department of History
 Department of Journalism
 Department of Kannada
 Department of Mathematics
 Department of Physical Education
 Department of Physics
 Department of Political Science
 Department of Psychology
 Department of Statistics
 Department of Sociology
 Department of Sanskrit
 Department of Zoology

These departments are employed with excellent faculties who are excellent at their knowledge, wise and experienced, imparting their vision and knowledge to young thriving minds to make them successful in achieving goals, ambitions and to lead a bright future.

References

External links
Bhandarkars' Arts & Science College

Colleges in Karnataka
Universities and colleges in Udupi district
Academy of General Education
1963 establishments in Mysore State
Educational institutions established in 1963
Colleges of Mangalore University